is a passenger railway station located in Kanagawa-ku, Yokohama, Kanagawa Prefecture, Japan, operated by the private railway company Tokyu Corporation.

Lines

Station layout 
The station consists of a single island platform serving two tracks, located four stories underground from the station building.

Platforms

History
Tammachi Station was opened on February 14, 1926. It was rebuilt on January 31, 2006, as an underground station. The new station building opened on March 28, 2008.

Passenger statistics
In fiscal 2019, the station was used by an average of 13,562 passengers daily. 

The passenger figures for previous years are as shown below.

Surrounding area
 Japan National Route 1
 Kanagawa Station (5-minute walk)
 Higashi-Kanagawa Station (15 minutes on foot)
 Mitsuzawa-shimocho Station (10 minutes on foot)
Kanagawa Ward Office

See also
 List of railway stations in Japan

References

External links

 

Railway stations in Kanagawa Prefecture
Railway stations in Japan opened in 1926
Tokyu Toyoko Line
Stations of Tokyu Corporation
Railway stations in Yokohama